Germany is divided into sixteen States.

Baden-Württemberg
There are no windmills standing today in Baden-Württemberg, apart from a mock mill in a leisure park at Cleebronn.

Bavaria

Berlin

Brandenburg

See List of windmills in Brandenburg

Bremen

Hamburg

Hesse

Lower Saxony

See List of windmills in Lower Saxony

Mecklenburg-Vorpommern

See List of windmills in Mecklenburg-Vorpommern

North Rhine-Westphalia

See List of windmills in North Rhine-Westphalia

Rhineland-Palatinate

There are no windmills standing today in Rhineland-Palatinate.

Saarland

There are no windmills standing today in Saarland.

Saxony

See List of windmills in Saxony

Saxony-Anhalt

See List of windmills in Saxony-Anhalt

Schleswig-Holstein
See List of windmills in Schleswig-Holstein

Thuringia

See List of windmills in Thuringia

References

 
Germany